The Highway Capacity Manual (HCM) is a publication of the Transportation Research Board (TRB) of the National Academies of Sciences, Engineering, and Medicine in the United States. It contains concepts, guidelines, and computational procedures for computing the capacity and quality of service of various highway facilities, including freeways, highways, arterial roads, roundabouts, signalized and unsignalized intersections, interchanges, rural highways, and the effects of mass transit, pedestrians, and bicycles on the performance of these systems.

There have been seven editions with improved and updated procedures from 1950 to 2022, and major updates to the HCM 1985 edition, in 1994, 1997 and 2015. The HCM has been a worldwide reference for transportation and traffic engineering scholars and practitioners, and also the base of several country-specific capacity manuals. The most-recent version, the Highway Capacity Manual, Seventh Edition: A Guide for Multimodal Mobility Analysis was released in January 2022. Before that HCM 2016 or HCM6, was released in October 2016. The latest edition incorporates the latest research on highway capacity, quality of service, active traffic and demand management, and travel time reliability.

The Sixth Edition of HCM consists of four Volumes. Three volumes are available either in hard copy or PDF, whereas Volume IV is only available online. Volume IV of HCM is free, only requiring readers to create an account in hcmvolume4.org.

History
There are more than seven decades of research behind the HCM. The first edition of the Highway Capacity Manual was released in 1950 and contained 147 pages broken apart into eight parts. It was the result of a collaborative effort between the Transportation Research Board (TRB) and the Bureau of Public Roads, the predecessor to the Federal Highway Administration.

The following editions were published by TRB in 1965, 1985, 2000, 2010, 2016, and 2022. The fifth edition of HCM 2010 was the culmination of a multiagency effort—including TRB, American Association of State Highway and Transportation Officials (AASHTO), and Federal Highway Administration—over many years to meet the changing analytical needs and to provide contemporary evaluation tools.

In 2013 TRB contracted the development of a major update to the 2010 Highway Capacity Manual. The new and revised material was scheduled to be published as a 2015 interim update of the HCM 2010, known as the HCM 2015 Update. The final version, published as the Highway Capacity Manual, Sixth Edition: A Guide for Multimodal Mobility Analysis, or HCM 2016, or HCM6, was released in October 2016 and is available from TRB. The sixth edition incorporates the latest research on highway capacity, quality of service, active traffic and demand management, and travel time reliability.

See also

 Highway Safety Manual
 National Cooperative Highway Research Program (NCHRP)
 Route capacity
 Traffic congestion
 Transportation Research Board
 National Safety Council

References

External links
Official website HCM 6th Edition
HCM6 Overview, McTrans, Transportation Institute, University of Florida
Highway Capacity Manual, 6th Edition (2016), Volume 4

Road traffic management
Roads in the United States